KCHF (channel 11) is a religious independent television station licensed to Santa Fe, New Mexico, United States, serving the Albuquerque area and most of the state. It is owned by the estate of Belarmino "Blackie" Gonzalez (1933–2008) and his non-profit ministry, Son Broadcasting. KCHF's studios are located on 4th Street in northwestern Albuquerque, and its transmitter is located near Los Alamos.

KCHF's main channel is relayed on the fifth digital subchannel of KYNM-LD (channel 21.5) in Albuquerque to provide improved reception in areas of the city where the main signal from Los Alamos is hard to receive, and on translator K24ML-D (channel 24) in Taos, New Mexico and K29ME-D (channel 29) in Antonito, Colorado.

History
The original construction permit for KCHF was granted on January 19, 1983. The station signed on in January 1984 and was granted a license to cover on June 29, 1984. It claims to be the first VHF Christian television station in the United States. During the analog era, KCHF was one of a few Christian television stations in the United States to operate on the VHF band (KJNP-TV in Fairbanks, Alaska is another example). KCHF's digital transmitter was licensed on January 26, 2006.

Programming
Some of the programs produced by KCHF include Restoring God's People, Healing is for You, A Healthier You and God Answers Prayer.

God Answers Prayer is a weekday, studio-based talk show with a live call-in segment. A "best of" show, with highlights of the past week, is seen on Sundays.

As part of its compliance with the federal Children's Television Act, KCHF broadcasts over eight hours of E/I-compliant children's programming each week, mostly aimed at children under 10, including a five-hour block on Saturday mornings.

Technical information

Subchannels
The station's digital signal is multiplexed:

KCHF carried the country music channel Heartland on channel 11.3 beginning June 30, 2014. In early June 2016, Heartland was dropped for QVC with Antenna TV moving from 11.4 to 11.2 and WeatherNation moving from 11.2 to 11.6.

Translators

Analog-to-digital conversion
KCHF shut down its analog signal, over VHF channel 11, on June 12, 2009, the official date in which full-power television stations in the United States transitioned from analog to digital broadcasts under federal mandate. The station's digital signal remained on its pre-transition VHF channel 10. Through the use of PSIP, digital television receivers display the station's virtual channel as its former VHF analog channel 11.

References

External links
Official website

Television channels and stations established in 1984
CHF
Religious television stations in the United States
Buzzr affiliates
Retro TV affiliates
1984 establishments in New Mexico
Mass media in Santa Fe, New Mexico